Leka is a municipality in Trøndelag county, Norway. It is part of the Namdalen region. The administrative centre of the municipality is the village of Leknes on the island of Leka. Other villages in Leka include Sør-Gutvika and Madsøygrenda. The island municipality includes all of the island of Leka and part of the island of Austra as well as hundreds of smaller surrounding islands and skerries.

Primarily a fishing and farming community, Leka is the northernmost municipality in Trøndelag county. The island of Leka has been inhabited for at least 10,000 years, as evidenced by cave drawings in the Solsem section of the island.

The  municipality is the 325th largest by area out of the 356 municipalities in Norway. Leka is the 348th most populous municipality in Norway with a population of 570.

General information
The municipality of Leka was established on 1 October 1860 when it was separated from the large municipality of Kolvereid. Initially, the population of Leka was 1,702. On 1 January 1909, the southern district of Leka (population: 881) was separated from Leka to form the new municipality of Gravvik. This left Leka was 1,209 residents. The borders of Leka have not changed since then.  On 1 January 2018, the municipality switched from the old Nord-Trøndelag county to the new Trøndelag county.

On 8 June 2017, the Norwegian Parliament, the Storting, voted to merge the municipalities of Leka, Vikna, Nærøy, and Bindal to form one, large municipality effective 1 January 2020.  Leka and Bindal municipalities rejected the merger, but Vikna and Nærøy merged on that date to form the new municipality of Nærøysund.

Toponymy
The municipality (originally the parish) is named after the island of Leka since the island makes up a large portion of the parish and municipality. The meaning of the name is unknown, but it may come from the word  which can mean "gravelly ground".

Coat of arms
The coat of arms was granted on 21 April 1989. The official blazon is "Gules, a winged claw Or". This means the arms have a red field (background) and the charge is a wing and claw of an eagle. The wing and claw design has a tincture of Or which means it is commonly colored yellow, but if it is made out of metal, then gold is used. This is a reference to an incident which supposedly occurred in 1932, in which a three-year-old girl disappeared on the island, and was subsequently discovered beneath the nest of a White-tailed eagle, high up on a cliff where no three-year-old could possibly have climbed. The arms were designed by Einar H. Skjervold.

Churches
The Church of Norway has one parish within the municipality of Leka. It is part of the Namdal prosti (deanery) in the Diocese of Nidaros.

Geography

Leka is an island municipality encompassing the main island of Leka, the western part of the island of Austra (with the biggest locality being Gutvik), and many other small islands in the surrounding area. The tiny island groups of Sklinna and Horta lie to the west of the main islands. 

Sklinna Lighthouse is located in the westernmost part of the municipality. Leka borders Vikna and Nærøy municipalities to the south and Bindal (in Nordland county) to the north.

History
Dated to the Viking Age, the burial mound Herlaugshaugen is one of the largest (in Norway) from that era.

Government
All municipalities in Norway, including Leka, are responsible for primary education (through 10th grade), outpatient health services, senior citizen services, unemployment and other social services, zoning, economic development, and municipal roads. The municipality is governed by a municipal council of elected representatives, which in turn elect a mayor.  The municipality falls under the Trøndelag District Court and the Frostating Court of Appeal.

Municipal council
The municipal council of Leka is made up of 15 representatives that are elected to four year terms. The party breakdown of the council is as follows:

Mayor
The mayors of Leka:

1860–1865: N. Henriksen
1866–1871: C. Samuelsen
1872–1877: Otto Bach
1878–1881: Karl August Jensen
1882–1885: Johannes Furre (H)
1886–1887: Otto Bach (H)
1888–1891: Karl August Jensen (H)
1892–1895: Svend Rasmussen (H)
1896–1898: Karl August Jensen (H)
1899–1901: Johannes Furre (H)
1902–1904: Karl August Jensen (H)
1905–1909: Ludvig Bach 
1910–1919: Peder Aleksander Furre 
1920–1925: Ingvard Hiller (V)
1926–1928: Peder Aleksander Furre (Bp)
1929–1931: Edvard Haug (Bp)
1932–1937: Ingvard Hiller (V)
1938–1942: Edvard Haug (Bp)
1943–1945: Ole Nøstdal (NS)
1945-1945: Edvard Haug (Bp)
1946–1947: Hans Mikal Solsem (Ap)
1948–1951: Anders Leknes (Bp)
1952–1957: Hans Mikal Solsem (Ap)
1957-1958: Egil Hanssen (Ap)
1958-1959: Hans Mikal Solsem (Ap)
1960–1967: Jonas Lund (Ap)
1968–1969: Andreas Hansen (Sp)
1970–1971: Leif Rohnes (V)
1972–1975: Jonas Lund (Ap)
1976–1978: Arne Skillingstad (Sp)
1978–1979: Leif Rohnes (V)
1979-1979: Anders Kolstad (Sp)
1980–1983: Trond Pettersen (Sp)
1984–1987: Inge Aune (Ap)
1988–1995: Arve Haug (Sp)
1995–1999: Margrethe Holmboe Askeland (Sp)
1999–2002: Elisabeth Helmersen (Ap)
2002–2003: Mari-Anne Hoff (SV)
2003–2011: Arve Haug (Sp)
2011–2019: Per Helge Johansen (Sp)
2019–present: Elisabeth Helmersen (Ap)

Politics
In the 2007 municipal elections, Leka had the highest vote for the Centre Party in Norway, at 69.3 per cent.

Transportation
The island part of Leka (Skei) is connected to Gutvik by a ferry line, operated by Lekaferja.

Notable people 
 Christopher Brinchmann (1864 in Leka – 1940) a Norwegian archivist, literary historian and critic
 Annfinn Lund (1926 in Leka – 2001) a Norwegian civil servant and politician; the County Governor of Hedmark 1980/81
 Thomas Hjalmar Westgård (born 1995 in Leka) an Irish cross-country skier, competed in the 2018 Winter Olympics

References

External links

Municipal fact sheet from Statistics Norway 

 
Municipalities of Trøndelag
1860 establishments in Norway